Maximilian I, Prince of Hohenzollern-Sigmaringen (20 January 1636 – 13 August 1689, in Sigmaringen) was a German nobleman. He was the third ruling Prince of Hohenzollern-Sigmaringen; he ruled from 1681 until his death.

Life 
Maximilian was the son of Prince Meinrad I (1605-1681) from his marriage to Anna Marie (1613-1682), daughter of Ferdinand Baron of Törring at Seefeld. He was named after Elector Maximilian I of Bavaria, whom his father was serving at the time of his birth.

He joined the Imperial army, together with his younger brother Francis Anthony. He commanded a Dragoon regiment and, like his cousins in the Hohenzollern-Hechingen line, fought under Emperor Leopold I in the Fourth Austro-Turkish War. During the Franco-Dutch War, he commanded the imperial army on the Rhine. After the Peace of Nijmegen of 1675, Maximilian returned to Vienna.

Maximilian married Maria Clara in Boxmeer on 12 January 1666. She was a daughter of Count Albert of Berg-'s-Heerenberg. After the death of her brother Oswald III in 1712, she inherited the County of 's-Heerenberg, which thus fell to the House of Hohenzollern. Among his Dutch possessions were the Lordships of Boxmeer, Bergh, Diksmuide, Gendringen, Etten, Wisch, Pannerden and Millingen.
   
In 1681, his father died. Maximilian divided the inheritance with his brother. Francis Anthony received the County of Haigerloch; Maximilian received the original County of Sigmaringen. He initiated various construction projects in the town of Sigmaringen, among them an expansion of Sigmaringen Castle.

Marriage and issue 
From his marriage to Maria Clara, the following children:
 Anna Maria (1666-1668)
 Maria Magdalena Clara (1668-1725), a nun in Gnadenthal Abbey
 Cleopha Maria Theresa (1669-1731), a nun in Buchau Abbey
 Meinrad II Charles Anthony (1673-1715), Prince of Hohenzollern-Sigmaringen, married in 1700 to Countess Johanna Katharina von Montfort (1678-1759)
 Francis Albert Oswald (1676-1748), a canon in Cologne
 Francis Henry (1678-1731), a canon in Cologne and Augsburg
 Charles Anthony (1679-1684)
 Anthony Sidonius (1681-1719), fell in battle, married in 1712 to Countess Maria Josepha of Verdenberg and Namiest (1687-1745)
 John Francis Anthony (1683-1733) fell in battle, married:
 in 1712 to Maria Barbara Everhardt of Lightemhaag
 Maria Antonia of Frauenberg (b. 1705)
 Maximilian Froben Maria (1685-1734), a monk
 Charles (1687-1689)
 Friederike Christiane Maria (1688-1745), married in 1718 to Sebastian, Count of Montfort-Tettnang (1684-1728)

Ancestry

See also 
 House of Hohenzollern

Footnotes

References 
 
 Gustav Schilling: Geschichte des Hauses Hohenzollern in genealogisch fortlaufenden Biographien aller seiner Regenten von den ältesten bis auf die neuesten Zeiten, nach Urkunden und andern authentischen Quellen, Fleischer, Leipzig, 1843, p. 247 ff, Online
 Günter Schmitt: Sigmaringen, in: Günter Schmitt: Burgenführer Schwäbische Alb, vol. 3: Donautal. Wandern und entdecken zwischen Sigmaringen und Tuttlingen, Biberacher Verlagsdruckerei, Biberach, 1990, p. 41–62.

External links 
 Entry at Geneall.net

Princes of Hohenzollern-Sigmaringen
House of Hohenzollern
1636 births
1689 deaths
17th-century German people